Libbaya  (لبايا)  is a village in the Beka'a Valley of Lebanon, situated in the Western Beqaa District of the Beqaa Governorate. It lies southeast of Sohmor. There it is a roman temple.

During the war in the 1980s, four Israeli Cobra helicopters backing the attacking force strafed Libbaya and nearby villages, killing a Lebanese soldier.

History
There is a Roman temple near the town that was called Ain Libbaya or Ayn Libbaya. It was classified amongst a group of Temples of Mount Hermon by George Taylor.

In 1838, Eli Smith noted Libbaya's population as being Metawileh.

References

Bibliography

External links
Libbaya,  Localiban 

Populated places in Western Beqaa District
Shia Muslim communities in Lebanon

Archaeological sites in Lebanon
Tourist attractions in Lebanon
Ancient Roman temples
Roman sites in Lebanon